Ali Ansari (Urdu: علی انصاری) (born 8 September 1987) is a Pakistani actor, model, rapper, musician (trained drummer) and video jockey.

Career

Radio jockey and model 
Born in Lahore, his family moved to Saudi Arabia and when they came back in 2005 and settled down in Karachi, he began his career as a RJ for the hit radio show Dude, Where's My Song? before becoming a model.

Music 
He has released few songs, including Tere Naal Naal with Dino Ali in 2011 and the rap single Itna Deep Jaoge in 2022.

Acting 
He made his debut as a television actor in the 2015 television soap series, Riffat Appa Ki Bahuein. He gained popularity by playing the role of "Saarim" in romantic saga Khaani, "Arham" in Mehreen Jabbar's small screen venture Dino Ki Dulhaniya and as "Rayed" in Rang Mahal (2021). Ansari is currently appearing in a leading role in Moomal Entertainment's Bebaak.

Television

References

External links

Living people
Pakistani male models
Pakistani male television actors
Male actors from Karachi
Pakistani rappers
1987 births